Our School is a British documentary reality television programme on CBBC which first aired on 3 September 2014 and has run for seven series, with an eighth currently in production. It uses a fly-on-the-wall format to show the everyday lives of the staff and pupils in secondary schools and follows children as they move from Year 6 into Year 7. From series 5 onwards, the series featured pupils in both Year 7 and Year 8.

In 2019, a spin-off called Our School Summer Camp was made, featuring students from series 1, 2 and 3 and some new students, joined by headteacher Shirley Ballas.

Series overview

Development and production
Our School was commissioned in September 2013 by the production company TwoFour and CBBC (the children's television brand owned by the BBC and primarily aimed at children aged between the ages of 7 and 16). Each series of programmes follows the day-to-day school life of 11-year-olds as they transition from different primary schools to embark on their first year at a secondary school and the commencement of their Key Stage 3 education. The programme uses a fly-on-the-wall camera approach to record the trials and tribulations, the joys and the sorrows, and the successes and surprises, of eleven Year 7 pupils throughout the whole academic year. Each series is filmed in a different school.

Our School was publicly announced in early 2014. The series follows the same overall format as Educating..., another documentary reality television programme on Channel 4 from the same production company which was first broadcast in September 2011 and which also uses fly-on-the-wall cameras.

Our School has run for seven series on CBBC to date, with each series having between 15 and 20 episodes, and with each episode focusing on a particular event, group of students or storyline. In addition, there have been multiple specials in which students and schools from previous series are revisited. An eighth series is currently in production.

Episodes

Series 1 (2014–15)
The first series was filmed at Conyers School in the town of Yarm near Middlesbrough. It showed the Year 7 classes experiencing secondary school for the first time and featured some of the challenges they may face in later life.

The first series was made up of 15x30 minute episodes and began to be broadcast on 3 September 2014. The final episode of the series was aired on 10 December 2014.

In 2015 it was announced that a special episode would be added to the first series. This aired on 7 September 2015 and was a catch-up episode that saw the cameras return to see what had happened to the Year 7 pupils, who were now in Year 8.

Series 2 (2016)
The second series of Our School was filmed at Greenwood Academy in Castle Vale near Birmingham.

This series began to be aired on 5 January 2016 and ran for 15 weeks, with the final episode being broadcast on 12 April 2016. It was retitled Our School 2 and followed the same format as Series 1.

Series 3 (2017)
Before the launch of the third series there was one-off special, which saw two students, one from Series 1 and one from Series 2, swap schools for a day and get to know and interact with the other students. The special aired in August 2017.

The first episode of Series 3 of Our School was broadcast on 5 September 2017. It was filmed at Firth Park Academy in the Shiregreen area of Sheffield.

Special: When Conyers Met Greenwood

Series 4 (2018)
The fourth series was filmed in Scotland, at Shawlands Academy in the Shawlands area of Glasgow.

The New Boy
Laugh Out Loud
Give Us a Try
I'm Not Your Dude
 It's Great Outdoors
 A Piece of Cake
Something New
Frenemies 
Try Being Me
Express Yourself
You Can't Win 'Em All
We're All Scottish 
Deaducation
Back in the Day
Paws for Thought
Eyes on the Prize
In at the Deep End
Passion for Fashion
Edinburgh - Here We Come!
So This Is Christmas
SPECIALS:

 One Last Term 
 Moving Day 
 Return to Firth Park

Series 5 (2019)
The fifth series was filmed in south Wales, at Hawthorn High School (Ysgol Uwchradd Y Hawthorn) in the village of Hawthorn, Rhondda Cynon Taf near Pontypridd. In a new feature, for the first time year 8 pupils were also featured alongside the year 7 pupils in the show.

Series 6 (2020) 
Series 6 was filmed at Ryburn Valley High School in the town of Sowerby Bridge in the Upper Calder Valley of West Yorkshire. The first episode was broadcast on 26 August 2020.

Series 7 (2021-2022)
Series 7, filmed at Firth Park Academy, started broadcasting on CBBC on 6 September 2021. The series consists of 20 episodes aired over selected weeks of the Autumn and Spring terms of the current academic year as part of the Bitesize programming block. The first ten episodes aired during the first two weeks of the school year before taking a break. The series resumed with the remaining ten episodes from 17 January 2022. The episodes were made available on iPlayer as well.

Series 8 (2022) Our Boarding School    
Series 8 was filmed at Badminton School, an independent boarding and day school for girls in Westbury-on-Trym, Bristol.  The series was scheduled to start on 12th September 2022 but was delayed to a later date due to the death of Elizabeth II. As such, the BBC iPlayer synopsis for "Pen Pals" has a notice saying that it was filmed in 2021 before her death, as she is mentioned in the present tense once. The series is narrated by Diane Morgan.

References

External links 
 

2014 British television series debuts
CBBC shows
BBC high definition shows
BBC Television shows
English-language television shows
Television series about children
Television series about educators
Television series by ITV Studios